Hazy Creek is a stream in the U.S. state of West Virginia.

Hazy Creek was so named because the tree-lined creek experiences relatively little sunshine.

See also
List of rivers of West Virginia

References

Rivers of Raleigh County, West Virginia
Rivers of West Virginia